Stanleya is the name of two genera:

Stanleya (gastropod), a genus of gastropod
Stanleya (plant), a genus of plant